Vladislav Badiarov (Russian:Владислав Львович Бадьяров, born 1973 in Nalchik, Russia) is a Russian-Mexican violinist. He moved to Mexico at the age of 18 in 1991.  His brother is the baroque violist and violon maker Dmitry Badiarov.  He appeared at Festival Cervantino, in Guanajuato.

References

External links 
 Official Website

1973 births
Living people
Musicians from Nalchik
Mexican violinists
Male violinists
20th-century violinists
Soviet emigrants to Mexico
21st-century violinists
20th-century male musicians
21st-century male musicians